Aristarchus's inequality (after the Greek astronomer and mathematician Aristarchus of Samos; c. 310 – c. 230 BCE) is a law of trigonometry which states that if α and β are acute angles (i.e. between 0 and a right angle) and β < α then

 

Ptolemy used the first of these inequalities while constructing his table of chords.

Proof 
The proof is a consequence of the more widely known inequalities

,

 and 

.

Proof of the first inequality 
Using these inequalities we can first prove that

 

We first note that the inequality is equivalent to

which itself can be rewritten as

We now want show that

The second inequality is simply . The first one is true because

Proof of the second inequality 

Now we want to show the second inequality, i.e. that:

 

We first note that due to the initial inequalities we have that:

Consequently, using that  in the previous equation (replacing  by ) we obtain:
 
We conclude that

See also 

 Aristarchus of Samos
 Eratosthenes
 Posidonius

Notes and references

External links 
 
 Proof of the First Inequality
 Proof of the Second Inequality

Trigonometry
Inequalities